Damir Džumhur was the defending champion, but lost to Egor Gerasimov in the first round.

Karen Khachanov won the title, defeating Adrian Mannarino in the final, 6–2, 6–2.

Seeds
The top four seeds received a bye into the second round.

Draw

Finals

Top half

Bottom half

Qualifying

Seeds

Qualifiers

Lucky loser
  Ričardas Berankis

Qualifying draw

First qualifier

Second qualifier

Third qualifier

Fourth qualifier

References
 Main draw
 Qualifying draw

Kremlin Cup - Singles
2018 Men's Singles